Pronsk is an urban locality (an urban-type settlement) and the administrative center of Pronsky District of Ryazan Oblast, Russia. Population: 

Pronsk was first attested in chronicles in 1186. After Old Ryazan was destroyed by the Mongols, Pronsk remained the most prosperous town in the vicinity and long competed with Pereslavl-Ryazansky for the title of the most important center of the powerful Principality of Ryazan. Several times the local dynasty of princes assumed the throne in Ryazan. After the principality was absorbed by Muscovy in the 16th century, one branch of Princes Pronsky settled in the Polish–Lithuanian Commonwealth. Another branch was prominent in the Muscovite politics until the end of the century.

The settlement lies on the banks of the Pronya River, after which it takes the name. It is located in a relatively hilly part of the country and consists mainly of farm houses and fields. The road Nizhny Arkhangelsky is an old cobble-stone pathway leading from the main highway through the farm houses (dachas) onto the river. On the opposing side is a large church, which serves as a central point in the religious life of the people of Pronsk. The settlement has one bar and a restaurant located on Nizhny Arkhangelsky.

References

Urban-type settlements in Ryazan Oblast
Pronsky Uyezd